BHW, incorporated as BHW Holding AG, is German bank providing terminating deposits and mortgage loans. It is a wholly owned subsidiary of Deutsche Postbank Group.

History 
The company was founded in Berlin in 1928 as Beamten-Heimstättenwerk, which roughly translates as civil servants' home (building) society. After World War II, it moved its registered office to Hameln.

In 1990, it was re-organised as BHW Holding GmbH to become BHW Holding AG later, followed by an initial public offering in 1997. In March 2005, Deutsche Postbank announced that it has acquired a 9.2% stake in the company. Later that year, Deutsche Postbank made public its intent to purchase more than 90% of BHW's shares and made an offer to remaining shareholders. The acquisition was completed in 2005.

References

Deutsche Post